East Aurora High School located in East Aurora, Erie County, New York, United States. It is the only high school operated by the East Aurora Union Free School District.

References

Schools in Erie County, New York
Public high schools in New York (state)